The Criminal Justice and Courts Act 2015 is an Act of the Parliament of the United Kingdom which made a number of changes to the criminal justice system. It was introduced to the House of Commons on 5 February 2014 by Lord Chancellor Chris Grayling and received Royal Assent on 12 February 2015.

Provisions 
The act's provisions include the following:
 Imposing the payment of a charge of up to £600 on those convicted of a criminal offence at the point of conviction.
 Making jury misconduct a specific criminal offence with a penalty of up to two years in prison. Four new misconduct laws were included to prevent jurors conducting any research into details of a case, sharing details of the research with other jurors, disclosing details of juror deliberation, and "engaging in other prohibited conduct" such as using evidence not put before the court to decide a case. These are already offences under the Contempt of Court Act 1981.
 Raising the maximum age of jurors to 75 (from 70).
 Amending the extreme pornography law to ban the possession of pornographic images depicting acts of rape.
 Introducing a new offence of being "unlawfully at large" with a punishment of up to two years in prison for criminals who go on the run while serving the non-custodial element of their sentence.
 Making the offence of causing death by driving while disqualified indictable only and increasing the maximum sentence from 12 months to 10 years.
 Abolishing automatic early release for those convicted of serious terrorism charges or child rape.
 Ending police cautions for child pornography offences or supplying class A drugs as well as in those cases where an offender has been cautioned or convicted for a similar offence in the previous two years.
 Allowing single magistrates (rather than a bench of two or three) to preside over "low-level regulatory cases". This provision also allows certain offences to be dealt with by a single magistrate outside the courtroom.
 Creating "secure colleges", a new form of secure educational establishment for young offenders. The first "pathfinder secure college" is expected to open in the East Midlands in 2017.
 Restricting the judicial review process to specialist courts working to fixed timetables where only individuals or groups with a financial interest in a case can bring a challenge rather than general issue-based campaigning groups.
 Making a whole life order the starting point for murder in the case of the murder of a police or prison officer in the course of their duties.

Amendments 

 The March 2014 amendment modified the Malicious Communications Act 1988 and Section 127 of the Communications Act 2003. The maximum length of custodial sentencing for online harassment was increased from six months to two years, and magistrates gained the power to pass cases on to the Crown Court.
 The October 2014 amendment created a specific offence of distributing a private sexual image of someone without their consent and with the intention of causing them distress (commonly called "revenge porn"). The maximum custodial sentence is two years.

In committee 
In April 2014 the assistant director of the British Board of Film Classification told a Parliamentary Bill Committee that the Clause 16 proposal to criminalise rape pornography would not result in the blocking of scenes of sexual imagery that bear no relation to reality.

In June 2014 the parliamentary Joint Committee on Human Rights claimed that the bill's proposals to allow staff in "secure colleges" to use "reasonable force where necessary to ensure good order and discipline" would contravene the European Convention on Human Rights.

See also 
 Criminal Justice and Immigration Act 2008
 Backlash (pressure group)

References 

Criminal law of the United Kingdom
United Kingdom pornography law
2015 in British law
United Kingdom Acts of Parliament 2015